EAG may refer to:

Science and medicine 
 Electroantennography
 Estimated average glucose
 European Association of Geochemistry

Transport 
 Eagle Airways, a defunct New Zealand airline
 Eaglehawk railway station, in Victoria, Australia
 Eaglescliffe railway station, in England

Other uses 
 Ealing Art Group
 East Asian Games
 Education Action Group, in New Zealand
 Education Action Group Foundation, an American school choice advocacy group
 En Avant de Guingamp, a French football club
 Eurasian Group, a member of the Financial Action Task Force on Money Laundering
 European Air Group
 European-Atlantic Group
 Extended affix grammar